Frostpunk is a city-building survival videogame developed and published by 11 bit studios. Players take on the role of a leader in an alternate-history late 19th century, in which they must build and maintain a city during a worldwide volcanic winter, managing resources, making choices on how to survive, and exploring the area outside their city for survivors, resources, or other useful items. The game features several scenarios to undertake, each with their own stories and different challenges.

The game was initially released for Microsoft Windows in April 2018, but was later made available for PlayStation 4 and Xbox One in October 2019, and macOS in February 2021. The game received generally positive reviews upon release and sold over 3 million copies within three years of its release. 11 Bit studios has partnered with NetEase Games to release a port for iOS and Android titled Frostpunk Mobile. 

A sequel, Frostpunk 2, was announced on August 12, 2021.

Gameplay 
The player, known simply as "the Captain", starts out with a small group of survivors that consists of workers, engineers, and children, and several small caches of supplies with which to build a city. From there, players harvest coal, wood, steel and food in order to keep their society warm and healthy in the midst of fluctuating cold temperatures. Weather conditions and political turmoil can cause citizens to not want to work. In most scenarios, the city is centered around the generator, a coal-reliant steam engine that produces heat in a circular radius, which can be extended and intensified throughout the game, requiring greater coal input. The game emphasizes the need to prioritize buildings depending on the heat they require; houses and medical facilities will require close placement to the reactor, lest the player face outbreaks of frostbite and illness. Medical facilities and hothouses will need to be kept above -20°C, or face being inoperable. Workplaces also need to be insulated, which can be achieved through heaters or steam turbines, or completely circumvented with the introduction of machine labor, or "Automatons".

The player has the option to use laws to regulate the productivity of their society at the cost of possibly raising discontent, e.g. allowing child labour or forcing temporary 24-hour shifts, but also laws to develop better healthcare like prosthetics or extra rations to the sick. In most scenarios, the player also has the option to increase the citizens' support either by "Order" which includes buildings and laws to enforce security, or by "Faith", which includes buildings and laws that implement a religion. These two paths can be continued to the point of fanaticism, with the "Order" path leading to a militaristic autocracy, while the "Faith" path leads to a total theocracy. With the final law on either path, the Captain is proclaimed absolute ruler, and the hope mechanic is discarded. In addition, a platform is constructed to execute "enemies" or "unbelievers" by scalding them to death with steam from the generator; the player may schedule an execution to lower discontent in their city. Adopting any of the last three laws of both paths will lead to the "Crossed the line" ending should the city survive, where the game remarks how humanity forsook its values in the quest for survival. 11BitStudios have mentioned multiple times that the Law system was designed to force players to weigh the choice between survival or humanity, creating a moral dilemma the game is based around.

Technology is another gameplay feature, with the ever colder environment forcing the city to adapt with better insulation, stronger reactors, better industrial output and more efficient machinery. Building a workshop structure allows the player to research technology and buildings that will make the city more efficient. The city can also construct a beacon to scout the surrounding frozen wasteland for additional survivors and resources.

Plot
The game is set in an alternate 1886 where the eruptions of Krakatoa and Mount Tambora, the dimming of the Sun, and other unknown factors caused a worldwide volcanic winter. This in turn led to widespread crop failure and the death of millions. This event roughly lines up with the historical 1883 eruption of Krakatoa, a volcanic event that led to global cooling.

In response to this, several installations called "generators" were built by the British Empire and the United States in the coal-rich North, designed to be city centers in the event that dropping temperatures force mass migration from the south. In all scenarios, the player is the leader of a city or outpost, usually around a generator, and will have to manage resources to ensure the city's survival.

The game launched with three scenarios, each with different backgrounds and storylines. Three additional scenarios were added as DLCs, one free to all players and two as part of the Season Pass. Endless Mode was also introduced in a later patch that eschews narrative elements to focus on surviving for as long as possible while weathering intermediate storms.

A New Home

In the main scenario, the player is the leader of a group of explorers who fled the scarcity and unrest of London in an expedition to find supposed massive coal reserves in the North. Instead, the group gets separated from the main expeditionary party and discovers a massive heat generator in a giant sheltered crater and settles there, establishing the city of New London. The player begins to face the issue of the people's dwindling hope as they find out, through exploration, a city similar to theirs called Winterhome has been destroyed, leaving few survivors. The player has to make hard decisions in order to help the people stay hopeful, as well as prevent an uprising by those who wish to return to London. The player later also has to prepare enough supplies to make sure the city survives the ever decreasing temperature, starting at -20C, and slowly decreasing, with some spikes, to an average of -70C. After a certain time, and the conclusion of the Londoners Arc, refugees will arrive, warning of a "Great Storm" incoming, acting as an Endgame. The player will have to stockpile resources, collect refugees, and recall scouts and outposts before the Storm arrives. Coal mines become effectively inoperable due to the cold, the generator struggles to heat the people, frostbite becomes rampant, and hope falls as the temperature falls to -150C in the eye of the storm. Surviving the storm with at least one citizen will result in a "victory", though the consequences may vary. It is suggested that due to the severity of this storm, and its seemingly huge scale, New London is the last city on Earth.

The Arks

In the second scenario, the player is the leader of a group of scholars from Oxford and Cambridge responsible for establishing a self-operational city for the purpose of preserving seeds and plants from around the world from the volcanic winter. They settle around a generator located in an ice crevasse. Unlike most other scenarios, the city's population is entirely made up of engineers, and rely primarily on automatons for resource gathering. During gameplay, the player will be presented with the issue of the neighboring city of New Manchester struggling with resources, and will have to choose whether or not to help them prepare for the Great Storm.

The Refugees

In the third scenario, the player is set as the leader of a refugee group who have taken over a generator reserved originally for a large group of wealthy lords, led by Lord Craven, the last Prime Minister of the United Kingdom. The player will also have to deal with constant waves of refugees seeking shelter in the city, including the overthrown lords. The player will have to decide to accept them or reject them while also minding the limited resources they have access to; if the lords are allowed to return to the city, the player must either find a way to integrate them or else leave them to be killed or forced out by the people of the city.

The Fall of Winterhome

Released on September 19, 2018 as a free DLC, this scenario takes place just prior to the main scenario and centers around the city of Winterhome. Through ineffective management by a neglectful leader, resources ran dry and the city fell into anarchy and rioting. Hundreds die in the fighting, starvation, and cold. The player is tasked to rebuild what is left of the city and its residents, but after getting things under control, the player learns that the city's generator is damaged beyond repair, and has only a few days to put in practice an evacuation plan before the generator explodes.

Endless Mode

Introduced in Frostpunk's 1.3.0 patch, Endless Mode is a highly customizable scenario where players endeavor to build a city to survive for as long as possible. Unlike all the other scenarios, there is no major story or quest objective beyond surviving each winter storm as they come and the scenario only ends when the player loses (either the generator is destroyed or all the people die). Players can choose between two primary sub-modes and one of several different maps, each with different challenges players have to take into account while planning their city. The Endurance sub-mode features fewer available resources and harsher weather while the Serenity sub-mode grants the player most of the earlier technologies and enjoys shorter blizzards. An additional Temporary Hazards setting will also randomly plague players with severe setbacks that inhibit some aspect of their city for a limited time.

The Rifts

Released on August 27, 2019 as a DLC included in the Season Pass, The Rifts add a new canyon-filled map to Endless Mode with a new building - "The Bridge" - used to cross over them.

The Last Autumn

Released on January 21, 2020 as a DLC included in the Season Pass, The Last Autumn is a prequel scenario set just before the onset of the global winter. The British Empire has created the Imperial Exploration Company to scout across the Atlantic Ocean to Canada for sites to construct generators; the player is the overseer of one such location, "Site 113", for the intended evacuation of Liverpool. While constructing their own generator, the player will also be called to investigate the loss of contact with Sites 107 and 120 (destroyed by shoddy workmanship and a syndicalist revolt, respectively), leaving the player's construction site as Liverpool's last hope. If the player takes too long in construction, they risk being fired by the IEC and sent home, ending the game. As the scenario progresses, the first snow begins to arrive and the sea freezes, cutting the site off from the supply ships, and the player is informed that no further supplies will arrive and that the crew must continue to work on the generator and wait out the freezing weather until an icebreaker can arrive to take them home to England. If the generator is completed without the upgrades before the final supply ships arrive, the player can decide to leave and end the scenario at the cost of a less well prepared site. If the generator and all upgrades are built before the final supply ships arrival, the scenario ends with a victory as the crew returns to England with the last supply ships. The scenario includes new technology trees and resources, new buildings (including a telegraph station, labour unions, and docks), new Books of Law to determine societal changes moving forward, and new threats to the settlement, including toxic gas leaks and worker strikes. The DLC also includes "The Builders", a new sub-mode for Endless Mode, which involves rebuilding a destroyed generator in winter conditions.

On The Edge

The final DLC content of the Season Pass, released on August 20, 2020, On The Edge is a sequel to the main scenario. The player is the leader of "Outpost 11", set up by a scouting party from New London near an abandoned army warehouse uncovered by the Great Storm. The outpost is forced to satisfy increasing demands for resources in exchange for food, causing the workers to revolt and declare the outpost's independence from New London; at this point, the player can give the outpost a name of their choosing. Unlike other scenarios, the outpost has no generator (forced to rely on coal-fired braziers for heat, similarly to the later stages of The Last Autumn) and limited ways to produce resources locally, so they must depend on trade with other settlements they make contact with to make ends meet. Later in the game, the outpost is informed that New London is in a severe crisis and must choose to provide aid and save the city, or leave it to its fate and prepare for a wave of refugees. The DLC also includes the option of including outposts and trading in all sub-modes of Endless Mode, along the option of triggering random events that will hinder the city's progress.

Development 

The game was announced in August 2016. The developers were initially targeting a release in late 2017, but it was delayed until 24 April 2018. The game was released for the PlayStation 4 and Xbox One in October 2019. The game was developed using 11Bit Studios internal game engine named Liquid Engine.

Ports to iOS and Android are being developed by NetEase Games, with the iOS version expected by the end of 2021.

Reception

Frostpunk received "generally favorable reviews", according to review aggregator Metacritic. 

IGN wrote, "Even though the bleakness is palpable, Frostpunk is a captivating experience. The gameplay is unique and varied, using the best aspects of city-building and survival games, with a little exploration mixed in." GameSpot said it was "among the best overall takes on the survival city builder." Eurogamer recommended the game, calling it "a thrilling but thin survival twist on the city builder genre, oozing dark charisma and political dilemmas." PC Gamer lauded it for being "...a stressful, stylish, and addictive survival management game filled with incredibly difficult choices." Game Informer cited it as being one of the rare interactive experiences that forced the player to wrestle with big decisions.

It was nominated for "Best Strategy Game" at the Game Critics Awards, for "Best Visual Design" and "PC Game of the Year" at the 2018 Golden Joystick Awards, and for "Best Strategy Game" at The Game Awards 2018. It won the award for "Strategy Title of the Year" at the Australian Game Awards 2018, and was nominated for "Strategy/Simulation Game of the Year" at the D.I.C.E. Awards, for "Game, Simulation" at the National Academy of Video Game Trade Reviewers Awards, for "Music of the Year", "Best Original Soundtrack Album", and "Best Music for an Indie Game" at the 2019 G.A.N.G. Awards, and for "Narrative" at the 15th British Academy Games Awards.

As with many other titles by 11 Bit Studios, Frostpunk places more emphasis on its story than sandbox features. While the plot and soundtrack have been greatly praised, some have criticised the lack of re-playability, citing the predictability of the story upon repeat. Frostpunk does have endless game modes, where the player can build and expand their city with dynamic challenges, however many still feel there is missed opportunity in sandbox features.

It sold over 250,000 copies within three days of its release, over 1.4 million within a year and 3 million within three years.

Board game

A Frostpunk board game designed by Jakub Wiśniewski and Glass Cannon Unplugged and loosely based on the video game was sold via Kickstarter in October 2020. The Kickstarter campaign achieved €2,496,308 in sales.

Sequel
A sequel was announced on August 12, 2021. Frostpunk 2 is set in New London 30 years after the "Great Storm" of the original game, and the consequences of the advent of petroleum industry in New London.

References

External links
 

2018 video games
Fiction set in 1886
Video games set in the 1880s
Windows games
Alternate history video games
City-building games
Climate change in fiction
Real-time strategy video games
Simulation video games
Survival video games
Video games developed in Poland
Video games set in the Arctic
Steampunk video games
Post-apocalyptic video games
11 bit studios games
PlayStation 4 games
Xbox Cloud Gaming games
Xbox One games
Video games with alternate endings
1883 eruption of Krakatoa